Cristo Rey Jesuit College Preparatory of Houston is a Roman Catholic secondary school located on 6700 Mount Carmel Drive in Houston, Texas, United States. It was founded by the New Orleans Province of the Society of Jesus and continues to be a sponsored work of the Jesuits.  It is a part of the Cristo Rey Network and also affiliated with the Roman Catholic Archdiocese of Galveston-Houston. Father T. J. Martinez, S.J., was the founding president.

The school was opened in August 2009, on the campus of the former Mount Carmel High School. Like other Cristo Rey schools, students help pay for their tuition through a work-study program. All 60 of the school's first senior class graduated and were accepted into colleges, from the University of Texas to Georgetown.

Cristo Rey Jesuit, along with The Chinquapin School and Yellowstone Academy, is one of the few Greater Houston private schools that serve exclusively low income students. In 2016 the racial mix of the student body was: 78.3% Hispanic, 15.2% African American, and 3.5% mixed race.

Admission requirements
Financial: Students  should  come  from  a  family  with  sufficient financial  need  to  qualify  for  the  federal  free or  reduced  lunch  program. Families who are only slightly  over this level are still  encouraged  to  apply. The  PSAS  financial  aid application  will  be  used  to  verify  need  on  a  case-by-case  basis,  as  the  first  criterion  for admission.

Age: In general, students must be 14 years old by September 1 of the year they enroll. To work at a work site other than the Corporate Work Study office, a student must be at least 14.

Scholarship: Students must have at least average grades and attendance and be willing to work hard to achieve the high academic expectations and the work obligations of the school.

Employability: Students must possess the maturity and work ethic necessary to be successful in an office environment working with adults. All students must also be able to present legal verification of their citizenship or residence, and either  have or be able to obtain a social security number.

The Corporate Work-Study Program
The Corporate Work-Study Program provides students with the opportunity to receive a university-preparatory education while providing real-world work experience. Cristo Rey Jesuit students spend between one and two days each week at a major corporation in an entry-level job. The salary earned pays for approximately 70% of their tuition at Cristo Rey Jesuit.

Sports and extra-curricular activities
Cristo Rey Jesuit sponsors teams in cross country, tennis, and football, as well as for girls: soccer, basketball, volleyball, softball, and golf; and for boys: soccer, basketball, baseball, volleyball, and golf. It is a member of the Texas Christian Athletic League. Clubs and other activities include the areas of theater, chess, art, books, service, garden, woods (hiking, camping, environmentalism), Ambassadors (receive guests), Hearts on Fire, and National Honor Society. Clubs and activities depend on student interest and availability of sponsors. Cristo Rey Houston was one of three schools chosen nationally by the Center for the Advancement of Science in Space for inclusion of its experiments in the International Space Station in 2014.
In the 2017–2018 school year, it was announced that it would be the last year of the flag football team, and the following school year, football would be implemented in its place.
However, students' first commitment on the days they work is to their corporate sponsor; they may not miss work to participate in sporting events or other activities. Likewise, students who are struggling academically will be placed in tutoring and may be unable to participate in extra-curricular opportunities until they are able to improve their academic performance.

References

Further reading
 Kearney, G. R. More Than a Dream: The Cristo Rey Story: How One School's Vision Is Changing the World. Chicago, Ill: Loyola Press, 2008.

External links
Official school website
Cristo Rey Network
 Boston Globe - With sense of purpose, students cut class for a day 
 Bill & Melinda Gates Foundation - Success of Innovative Urban Catholic School Sparks Major Investment

Private high schools in Houston
Roman Catholic secondary schools in Houston
Educational institutions established in 2009
Cristo Rey Network
Jesuit high schools in the United States
Poverty-related organizations
2009 establishments in Texas